Below are the rosters for the 1999 FIFA Confederations Cup tournament in Mexico.

Group A

Bolivia
Head coach:  Héctor Veira

Egypt
Head coach: Mahmoud El-Gohary

Mexico
Head coach: Manuel Lapuente

Saudi Arabia
Head coach:  Milan Máčala

Group B

Brazil
Head coach: Vanderlei Luxemburgo

Germany
Head coach: Erich Ribbeck

New Zealand
Head coach: Ken Dugdale

United States
Head coach: Bruce Arena

External links
FIFA.com

FIFA Confederations Cup squads
Squads